A sectoral currency is a form of complementary currency that is restricted to a specific sector. Examples of sectoral currency are the Saber, which is restricted to the educational sector and thus can only be used to buy education, and the Fureai kippu, which is restricted to the health care sector.

Sectoral currencies can make people provide the type of services they themselves require or intend to use in the future, which means people may act collectively intelligent because a currency is not generally redeemable.

Local currencies